Aas Paas is a 1981 Indian Hindi-language romance film directed by J. Om Prakash and starring Dharmendra, Hema Malini and Prem Chopra. The music was by Laxmikant–Pyarelal.  The film begins with a dedication to the late singer Mohammed Rafi, announcing that his last recorded song was for this film.

Director-producer J. Om Prakash included in Aas Paas (1981) another brief "Lucky Mascot" screen appearance of his grandson — future Hindi film superstar actor Hrithik Roshan, then age 7 — as the boy dancing in the song "Shehar Main Charcha Hai" who winks at Hema Malini and passes her a love note from Dharmendra.

Plot
Arun meets Seema by accident and they are attracted to each other. But Seema has a questionable background, which creates doubts in the minds of Arun and his mother.

Arun is involved in an accident, and everyone believes that he is dead. Seema is devastated and takes to alcohol, singing and dancing in a bar, and is raped. Arun returns. Seema is overjoyed to see him but hesitant to tell him about what had occurred.

Arun takes Seema to his home and introduces her to his family, namely his mom, his sister, Priti, and his brother-in-law, Prem. Seema is stunned and shocked when she sees Prem — she recognizes him as the man who raped her. Seema must decide to keep this terrible secret to herself and marry Arun or simply disappear from his life altogether

In the end, when Seema commits suicide, but Arun lies to his family that she is still alive. In the hospital, Prem attempts strangling Seema's corpse and Arun realizes his brother-in-law's evil nature and kills him. Seema is cremated as a bride like she desired to be and Arun is arrested living on Seema's memories.

Cast
Dharmendra as Arun Choudhury
Hema Malini as Seema
Prem Chopra as Prem
Nadira as Rani
Om Prakash as Seema's father
Nirupa Roy as Arun's mother
Aruna Irani as Rama
G. Asrani as Jaikishen
Rajendra Nath as Seth Ramiklal
Indrani Mukherjee as Priti
Raza Murad as Master, Bandit
Bhagwan Dada as Bandit, Associate 
Hrithik Roshan as (uncredited) boy dancing in the song "Shehar Main Charcha Hai"

Soundtrack

References

External links
 

1981 films
Films scored by Laxmikant–Pyarelal
1980s Hindi-language films
Films directed by J. Om Prakash